The Calcare di Sogno ("Sogno Limestone"; also known as the Sogno Formation) is a geological formation in Italy, dated to roughly between 183-181 million years ago and covering the Toarcian stages of the Jurassic Period in the Mesozoic Era. Thallatosuchian remains are known from the formation.

Description 
The formation is characterized by a disposition of regional deposition equivalent to the German Posidonia Shale, with a benthonic setting and deposition trends, mostly populated by marine fauna. The environment of the formation was related to a marginal marine deposit, with probably epicontinental deposition from near land environments, being connected to the central European seas of the Toarcian.

Fossil content

Flora 
Several plant leaves and fragments of wood were not identified.

Molluscs

Arthropods

Fish

Crocodyliformes

See also 
 List of fossiliferous stratigraphic units in Italy
 Toarcian turnover
 Toarcian formations
Marne di Monte Serrone, Italy
 Mizur Formation, North Caucasus
 Sachrang Formation, Austria
 Posidonia Shale, Lagerstätte in Germany
 Irlbach Sandstone, Germany
 Ciechocinek Formation, Germany and Poland
 Krempachy Marl Formation, Poland and Slovakia
 Djupadal Formation, Central Skane
 Lava Formation, Lithuania
 Azilal Group, North Africa
 Whitby Mudstone, England
 Fernie Formation, Alberta and British Columbia
 Poker Chip Shale
 Whiteaves Formation, British Columbia
 Navajo Sandstone, Utah
 Los Molles Formation, Argentina
 Mawson Formation, Antarctica
 Kandreho Formation, Madagascar
 Kota Formation, India
 Cattamarra Coal Measures, Australia

Notes and references

Notes

References

Bibliography 
  

Geologic formations of Italy
Jurassic System of Europe
Jurassic Italy
Toarcian Stage
Limestone formations
Marl formations
Shallow marine deposits
Fossiliferous stratigraphic units of Europe
Paleontology in Italy
Formations